Singer Vehicle Design is an American company that modifies Porsche 911s. It was founded by Rob Dickinson, who is also known as former frontman and guitarist of the English rock band Catherine Wheel. The company is based in Los Angeles, California.

Name
The name Singer Vehicle Design pays homage to noted Porsche engineer Norbert Singer as well as acknowledging Dickinson's previous career as a vocalist.

Motto
The company's motto is "everything is important", a reference to their design philosophy in which no aspect of the car is overlooked and even the smallest details are enhanced.

Products
The company's main product is a "re-imagined" 911, which is a heavily modified coupe or Targa Porsche 964. Much of the bodywork is replaced with carbon fiber body panels and the engine is reworked by engine manufacturers such as Cosworth, Ed Pink Racing Engines and Williams to produce significantly more power. The long hood of the Porsche 911 classic replaces the shorter hood of the Porsche 964. Relocated fuel filler and oil filler caps are a nod to historic Porsche race cars. The tachometer is colored in Singer Orange and displays values up to 11, a reference to the up to 11 meme (though engine redline is 7,900 RPM). The price of a 911 re-imagined by Singer starts at over $475,000 and can reach $1.8 million. Examples have sold at auction for well over $1M. Many of the components are bespoke and/or motorsports-grade.

Singer has also begun selling wrist watches.

References

External links

Singer 911 on Wikimedia Commons

Porsche
Sports cars
Luxury vehicles
Auto tuning companies
Automotive motorsports and performance companies
Cars powered by boxer engines